Kent Robin Tønnesen (born 5 June 1991) is a Norwegian handball player for SC Pick Szeged and the Norwegian national team.

Honours
World Championship:
: 2017

References

External links
 
 
 Kent Robin Tønnesen at the Norwegian Handball Federation 
 
 

1991 births
Living people
Norwegian male handball players
People from Lørenskog
IK Sävehof players
HSG Wetzlar players
Expatriate handball players
Norwegian expatriate sportspeople in Germany
Norwegian expatriate sportspeople in Hungary
Norwegian expatriate sportspeople in Sweden
Handball-Bundesliga players
Füchse Berlin Reinickendorf HBC players
Veszprém KC players
Handball players at the 2020 Summer Olympics
Sportspeople from Viken (county)
Olympic handball players of Norway